The Defence High Command (AEM) was the principal staff body of the Spanish Armed Forces during the Francoist regime and the Spanish transition to democracy. It operated between 1939 and 1980, and was in charge of coordination between the staffs of the three branches of the Armed Forces (Army, Navy and the Air Force).

History 
The AEM was created on 30 August 1939 with the objective of having a "body of coordination, study and information, which would provide to the supreme command the elements of suitable judgment for the orientation of its designs". In this way the Defence High Command is constituted with the following tasks:

 Submit to the authority studies and proposals for the management of national energies so that in case of war they were insured to the maximum extent their evolution and functioning in autarkic regime.
 Prepare the study of the resolutions that proceed in order to the weighting of organic media between the Army, Navy and the Air Force.
 Study and propose the general lines of the permanent organizations that should constitute bases of combined operations of the aforementioned forces.
 Study and propose directives and plans for their joint action in case of war.
 Provide the supreme command with the necessary information for the appreciation of the military and economic potential of other countries.

For this it was necessary on the one hand the appointment of a General-Chief who would be a member and secretary of the National Defense Junta, and on the other hand the creation of a secretariat and three sections: a military, an economic and an informational.

On 5 February 1944, the need to act against foreign intelligence services within Spain was raised. That is why a new military intelligence agency began operating, the so-called "" (SIAEM). However, due to problems of coordination between the various counterintelligence mechanisms of the time, it was decided in 1945 to divide the powers: the Defence High Command would be in charge of espionage and counterintelligence of military character both inside and outside the country, while the Ministry of the Interior would be in charge of the internal security of the country, and the rest of the ministries would collect the general information according to their needs.

After the death of Franco in 1975, the administrative structure of the Armed Forces was reorganized. The AEM disappeared in 1980 when all its functions were taken over by the Board of Joint Chiefs of Staff (JUJEM), which was succeeded in 1984 by the Defence Staff (EMAD).

List of chiefs of the Defence High Command 
† denotes people who died in office.

Timeline

See also 
 Board of Joint Chiefs of Staff
 Defence Staff (Spain)
 Chief of the Defence Staff (Spain)
 Spanish Armed Forces during the period of Francoism
 Ministry of the Army (Spain)
 Ministry of the Navy (Spain)
 Ministry of the Air (Spain)

Notes

References 

Military of Spain
Staff (military)
1939 establishments in Spain
1980 disestablishments in Spain